There have been several electoral districts in Canada named Queen's or Queens.

Federal 

Queen's (New Brunswick electoral district), which returned members to the Canadian House of Commons from 1867–1892
Queens (Nova Scotia federal electoral district), which returned members to the House of Commons from 1867–1892
Queen's (Prince Edward Island electoral district), which returned members to the House of Commons from 1903–1966

Provincial 
Queens (Nova Scotia provincial electoral district), which has existed since 1941
Queens (New Brunswick provincial electoral district), in use from 1785 to 1974 in the province of New Brunswick
Queen's (Prince Edward Island provincial electoral district), which returned members to the Legislative Assembly of Prince Edward Island from 1903–1966

See also 
Queen's County (electoral district), a Prince Edward Island electoral district which returned members to the House of Commons from 1873–1892
 Queens (disambiguation) for other places named "Queens" or "Queen's"